Sociedad Deportiva Narcea is a Spanish football club based in Cangas del Narcea, in the autonomous community of Asturias.

History
Founded in 1962, Narcea played always in Regional leagues until its first promotion to Tercera División in 1996. After six seasons in two streaks, the club declined and came back to the sixth tier.

Stadium
Narcea plays its home games at Estadio El Reguerón, with a capacity for 1,200 spectators. In 2006, the pitch was replaced by one made of artificial turf and floodlights were installed.

Season to season

6 seasons in Tercera División

References

External links
SD Narcea Facebook account

Football clubs in Asturias
Association football clubs established in 1962
1962 establishments in Spain